Valencia is a 2000 Lambda Literary Award-winning novel by Michelle Tea. It is an autobiographical novel detailing the narrator's experiences in San Francisco's queer subculture. It includes experimentation with consensual sado-masochism after the author meets Petra, a knife-wielder; as well as Willa, a tormented poet; and Iris, a young butch who escaped from a repressive southern upbringing to San Francisco.

Film adaptation
During 2011, Valencia was adapted into an arthouse film, with twenty-one different lesbian and queer directors enlisted to film each of the book's twenty-one chapters within a series of short film segments. They include Cheryl Dunye, Courtney Trouble, trans film maker Amos Mac, documentarian Hilary Goldberg and others. The film premiered at the Frameline Film Festival in May 2013.

References

2000 American novels
2000s LGBT novels
American LGBT novels
Lambda Literary Award-winning works
Picaresque novels
Novels set in San Francisco
American novels adapted into films
Seal Press books
2000 LGBT-related literary works